Antoine Pilon (born July 9, 1993) is a Canadian actor from Saint-Bruno-de-Montarville, Quebec. He is most noted for his role as Émile Lapointe in the television drama series Nouvelle adresse, for which he was a Gémeaux Award nominee for Best Supporting Actor in a Drama Series in 2015.

His other roles have included the films Garage at Night (Garage de soir), The Squealing Game (La chasse au collet), Mad Dog Labine and Matthias & Maxime, and the television series Victor Lessard, Terreur 404, Le Chalet, Manuel de la vie sauvage and Entre deux draps.

He is in a relationship with actress Catherine Brunet.

References

External links

1993 births
21st-century Canadian male actors
Canadian male television actors
Canadian male film actors
French Quebecers
Male actors from Quebec
People from Saint-Bruno-de-Montarville
Living people